Christian Swärd (born March 28, 1987, in Karlstad, Sweden) is a professional Swedish ice hockey player.

He is a free agent. He made his Swedish Elite League debut with Färjestads BK during the 2006/07 season, playing a total of 4 games and scoring 1 point. Swärd is not drafted by any NHL club.

External links

1987 births
Färjestad BK players
Living people
Swedish ice hockey forwards
Sportspeople from Karlstad